Modiolus, the horsemussels, are a genus of medium-sized marine bivalve molluscs in the family Mytilidae.

Fossil record 

Fossils of species within this very ancient genus can be found in sediments from the Devonian period to recent (age range: 409.1 to 0.0 Ma).

Species

Species within the genus Modiolus include:

 Modiolus adriaticus (Lamarck, 1819)
 Modiolus albicostus (Lamarck, 1819)
 Modiolus americanus (Leach, 1815) - tulip mussel
 Modiolus areolatus  (Gould, 1850) 
 Modiolus auriculatus  (Krauss, 1848) 
 Modiolus aurum  Osorio Ruiz, 1979
 Modiolus barbatus (Linnaeus, 1758) - bearded horsemussel
 Modiolus capax (Conrad, 1837) - fat horsemussel
 Modiolus carpenteri (Soot-Ryen, 1963) - California horsemussel
 Modiolus carvalhoi  Klappenbach, 1966
 Modiolus cecillii   (Philippi, 1847) 
 Modiolus cimbricus Ockelmann and Cedhagen, 2019
 Modiolus comptus   (Sowerby, 1915) 
 Modiolus demissus
 Modiolus eiseni (Strong and Hertlein, 1937) - eisen horsemussel
 Modiolus ficoides  Macsotay & Campos, 2001
 Modiolus gallicus  (Dautzenberg, 1895) 
 Modiolus gubernaculum   (Dunker, 1856) 
 Modiolus kurilensis  F. R. Bernard, 1983
 Modiolus lulat   (Dautzenberg, 1891) 
 Modiolus margaritaceus   (Nomura & Hatai, 1940) 
 Modiolus matris  Pilsbry, 1921
 Modiolus modiolus (Linnaeus, 1758) - northern horsemussel
 Modiolus modulaides   (Röding, 1798) 
 Modiolus neglectus (Soot-Ryen, 1955) - neglected horsemussel
 Modiolus nicklesi  Ockelmann, 1983
 Modiolus nipponicus   (Oyama, 1950) 
 Modiolus patagonicus  (d'Orbigny, 1842) 
 Modiolus penetectus   (Verco, 1907) 
 Modiolus peronianus  Laseron, 1956
 Modiolus phaseolinus
 Modiolus philippinarum (Hanley, 1843)
 Modiolus plumescens (Dunker, 1868)
 Modiolus rectus (Conrad, 1837) - straight horsemussel
 Modiolus rumphii (Philippi, 1847)
 Modiolus sacculifer (S. S. Berry, 1953) - bag horsemussel
 Modiolus squamosus Beauperthuy, 1967
 Modiolus stultorum (Jousseaume, 1893)
 Modiolus traillii (Reeve, 1857)
 Modiolus tumbezensis Pilsbry & Olsson, 1935
 Modiolus verdensis Cosel, 1995

References

External links

 Biolib

 
Bivalve genera
Taxa named by Jean-Baptiste Lamarck
Extant Devonian first appearances
Devonian genus first appearances